Solapur railway station is located in Solapur district in the Indian state of Maharashtra and serves Solapur city and the industrial belt around it. It is headquarters of Solapur Railway Division and a part of Central Railway zone.

Solapur lies on the planned Mumbai–Hyderabad high-speed rail corridor. Option of Ahmednagar Karmala railway line is also getting explored.

History
The first passenger train in India from Chhatrapati Shivaji Maharaj Terminus in Mumbai to  ran on 16 April 1853 on the track laid by the Great Indian Peninsula Railway. While construction work was in progress across the Bhor Ghat, GIPR opened to public the – track in 1858. The Bhor Ghat incline connecting Palasdari to Khandala was completed in 1862, thereby connecting Mumbai and Pune.

The Pune–Raichur sector of the Mumbai–Chennai line was opened in stages: the portion from Pune to Barshi Road was opened in 1859, from Barshi Road to Mohol in 1860 and from Mohol to Solapur also in 1860. Work on the line from Solapur southwards was begun in 1865 and the line was extended to Raichur in 1871.

The metre-gauge Solapur–Hubli line was opened in stages. The Gadag–Hotgi section was opened in 1884. The lines were converted to broad gauge by 2008.

It is the 19th cleanest station in India (as of 2019) and one of the Beautiful railway station in India ranked A-1 among 500 main stations in India.

Electrification

Railway electrification in India began with the first electric train, between Bombay Victoria Terminus and Kurla by the Great Indian Peninsula Railway's (GIPR) on 3 February 1925, on 1.5 kV DC. The Kalyan–Pune section was electrified with 1.5 kV DC overhead system in 1930. These sections were converted from 1.5 kV DC to 25kV AC by 2015.

The Pune–Daund section as well as Daund–Bhigwan section was electrified in 2017. The electrification of the Bhigwan-Kalaburgi section is in progress with completion expected by March 2021.

Rail Vikas Nigam Limited team achieved another milestone of execution of RE of Hotgi-Solapur double line section RKM 14.96 & TKM 44.71. The Solapur-Kalaburgi Double line section is now totally electrified.

Inspection of railway electrification work between Hotgi-Solapur double line section (RKM 14.96 & TKM 44.71) was successfully completed. With the commissioning of this section, now 610 RKM railway electrification work is completed out of 641 RKM of the PUNE-WADI-GUNTAKAL section electrification project. 

The project covers a very important route of the golden quadrilateral connecting Mumbai & Chennai city. In addition to this, all south-going electric passenger & goods train from an important city like Hyderabad, Chennai & Bangalore (Southcentral Railway & Southwest  Railway) can come up to Solapur district, Maharashtra ( Central Railway) on electric traction

Passenger movement
Solapur railway station is amongst the top hundred booking stations of Indian Railway. It serves about 120,000 passengers every day.

References

Further reading

External links
 
 Solapurmajha Online Local Directory

Railway stations in Solapur district
Solapur railway division
Railway stations opened in 1860
Transport in Solapur

Indian Railway A1 Category Stations